Seán Doherty (29 June 1944 – 7 June 2005) was an Irish Fianna Fáil politician who served as Cathaoirleach of Seanad Éireann from 1989 to 1992, Minister for Justice from March 1982 to December 1982 and Minister of State for Justice from 1980 to 1981. He served as a Teachta Dála (TD) from 1977 to 1989 and 1992 to 2002. He was a Senator for the Administrative Panel from 1989 to 1992.

Background
Born and raised in Cootehall near Boyle, County Roscommon, he was educated at national level in County Leitrim and then at University College Dublin and King's Inns.

In 1965, Doherty became a member of the Garda Síochána and served as a Detective in Sligo before joining the Special Branch in Dublin in the early 1970s.

Doherty came from a family which had a long tradition of public service and political involvement in County Roscommon. In 1973, Doherty took a seat on Roscommon County Council, which was vacant after the death of his father.

Doherty married Maura Nangle, who is the sister of Irish musician Carmel Gunning. Together they had four daughters, Rachel Doherty was a councillor on Roscommon County Council.

Political career
After serving for four years as a local representative on Roscommon County Council, Doherty was elected as a Fianna Fáil TD for the Roscommon–Leitrim constituency at the 1977 general election.

Support of Charles Haughey
In 1979, Doherty was a key member of the so-called "gang of five" which supported Charles Haughey's attempt to take over the leadership of the party. The other members were Albert Reynolds, Mark Killilea Jnr, Tom McEllistrim and Jackie Fahey.

Haughey was successful in the leadership contest and Doherty was rewarded by being appointed Minister of State at the Department of Justice from 1979 to 1981. In the short-lived 1982 Fianna Fáil government, Doherty entered the Cabinet as Minister for Justice. In this post, he became involved in a series of controversies.

Dowra affair
The brother of Seán Doherty's wife Maura, Garda Thomas Nangle, was charged with assaulting James McGovern, a native of County Fermanagh, in a public house in December 1981. On 27 September 1982, hours before the case was due to be heard in the District Court in Dowra, a small village in northwest County Cavan, McGovern was arrested by the Special Branch of the RUC on the basis of entirely false Garda intelligence that he was involved in terrorism. The case against Nangle was dismissed because the principal witness, McGovern, failed to appear in court. The solicitor representing Nangle was Kevin Doherty, Seán Doherty's brother. This 'questionable' use of Garda/RUC Special Branch liaison, set up under the 1985 Hillsborough Anglo-Irish Agreement, prevented meetings between the Garda Commissioner and the RUC chief constable for almost three years.

Phone tapping
After Doherty left office it was revealed in The Irish Times that he ordered the tapping of three journalists' home telephones. The newspaper also disclosed that he had been interfering in the workings of the Garda and the administration of justice for both political and personal reasons. He immediately resigned from the party; however, he rejoined in 1984. At the 1989 general election, he lost his seat in Dáil Éireann to the independent candidate Tom Foxe.

Seanad Éireann
He was also an unsuccessful candidate in the elections on the same day to the European Parliament, but he was later elected instead to Seanad Éireann as a Senator for the Administrative Panel and became the Cathaoirleach (Chairman) of the 19th Seanad.

End of Haughey term

In January 1992, the phone tapping scandal returned to haunt Fianna Fáil. Doherty announced in a television interview that he had shown transcripts of the conversations to Charles Haughey while Haughey was Taoiseach in 1982. Doherty had previously denied this. Haughey denied the claim also, but was forced to resign from office, and then resigned as leader of Fianna Fáil. Doherty then regained his seat at the 1992 general election and held it until his retirement at the 2002 general election.

Death
Seán Doherty died at Letterkenny General Hospital as a result of a brain haemorrhage on 7 June 2005 while on a family holiday in County Donegal.

References

 

1944 births
2005 deaths
Fianna Fáil TDs
Cathaoirligh of Seanad Éireann
Members of the 21st Dáil
Members of the 22nd Dáil
Members of the 23rd Dáil
Members of the 24th Dáil
Members of the 25th Dáil
Members of the 19th Seanad
Members of the 27th Dáil
Members of the 28th Dáil
Local councillors in County Roscommon
Ministers for Justice (Ireland)
Ministers of State of the 21st Dáil
Fianna Fáil senators
Alumni of King's Inns